Río Frías Formation is a Middle Miocene geologic formation made up sedimentary rock located in Aysén Region, western Patagonia. The formation crops out along the upper couse of Cisnes River. Marsupial fossils have been found in the formation. The Friasian period in the South American Land Mammal Ages is named after the formation.

Description 
Río Frías Formation was discovered by Santiago Roth in the summer of 1897–98. Roth was a Swiss immigrant who had been sent to survey the area by Francisco Moreno. Moreno was director of La Plata Museum and was involved in the Cordillera of the Andes Boundary Case between Chile and Argentina, thus there was both a political and scientific motivation behind the exploration of Patagonia. Santiago Roth called the upper course of Río Cisnes for Río Frías being unaware that it was the same river. Further he thought this unexplored area to be in Argentina and not in Chile. This led the formation to acquire its name. Roth sent fossils he collected from the formation to Florentino Ameghino who was active at La Plata. It was with this fossils Ameghino established the Friasian period. Later research on 40Ar/39Ar data revealed the base of the formation dating to 16.5 Ma, which means a slight overlap with the Santacrucian land mammal age (ending at 16.3 Ma). The formation was deposited in a fluvial environment, characterized by an  intermontane valley flanked by Cretaceous basement rocks.

Fossil content 
The following fossils have been found in the formation:

References

Bibliography 
 
 
 
 
 

Geologic formations of Chile
Miocene Series of South America
Neogene Chile
 
Tuff formations
Siltstone formations
Conglomerate formations
Fluvial deposits
Formations
Geology of Aysén Region